Wimkin is an alt-tech social network that claims to promote free speech. The site describes itself as "100% uncensored social media". Wimkin was launched in August 2020 and was founded by Jason Sheppard. As of December of 2022, Wimkin had 8,493,000 users with nearly 600,000 active daily users. Wimkin offers free live streaming, 10GB video uploads, Reels, Groups, Pages, Marketplace, free voice and video chat messenger and is very similar in design to Facebook, Youtube, TikTok and Twitter combined.

History 
Wimkin launched in August 2020 after being founded by Jason Sheppard. 

On January 12, 2021, Apple removed Wimkin from the Apple App Store for hosting violent content, including calls for a civil war and the arrest of then-Vice President Mike Pence. Sheppard stated that Wimkin had removed the violent content after Apple reported it to them.  However, Apple claimed that they "continued to find direct threats of violence and calls to incite lawless action" on Wimkin. After Wimkin was removed from the App Store, Wimkin's website was hit with a DDoS attack. 

Google subsequently removed Wimkin from the Google Play Store, with a Google spokesperson saying of the ban that, "We don't allow apps that depict or facilitate gratuitous violence or other dangerous activities." In response, Sheppard accused Google of treating Wimkin unfairly, stating in an email that, "We're being treated entirely unfairly and if we aren't reinstated when we've worked tirelessly to comply and become a better platform, we will be seeking legal remedy to at the very least, shed some light into this tyrannical monopoly." 

In a message on Wimkin's website following the removals, the company said that "We are working on getting back in both Apple Store and Google Play." Wimkin has since returned to both the App Store and Google Play.

After Parler, another social network, was pulled offline by its host Amazon Web Services on January 11, former users of that site started migrating to Wimkin. In the twelve days following the storming of the United States Capitol, Wimkin claimed that its userbase had grown by 20 percent, amounting to around 55,000 new users.

Users and content 
While Wimkin has groups relating to mundane topics, such as pets and traveling, Wimkin also has groups relating to fringe content, such as the far-right conspiracy theory QAnon. There were also posts and a group on Wimkin attempting to organize a "Million Militia March" for January 20, 2021 on Inauguration Day, but the posts and group were removed.

In January 2021, David Eberti of The Wall Street Journal found posts on Wimkin comparing Democrats with Nazis and a meme saying "If you don't believe in violence, get ready to hide behind someone who does."

Moderation 
Wimkin prohibits pornography, nudity, harassment, and inciting violence or any posts or comments with a criminal element. The site also does not fact-check posts.

Reception 
In January 2021, Chris Tye from WBBM-TV described Wimkin as a platform "used by members of the so-called Trump celebrity class." Also in January, Anthony Cuthbertson of The Independent called Wimkin "yet another social media app popular with far right users".

Design 
According to SFGate, Wimkin functions like a combination of Twitter and Facebook, with users of the site being allowed to post to a wider audience, comment and like other posts, and join groups. Users enjoy 10GB video upload limitations, free live streaming, free video and voice chat messenger, marketplace, groups, pages and more. Wimkin also offers Reels similar to Facebook and TikTok.

References 

Real-time web
Websites with far-right material
Delisted applications
Conspiracist media
Social networking websites
Online companies
Alt-tech
Internet properties established in 2020